Joromi may refer to:

  "Joromi", a 1965 song by Victor Uwaifo
 "Joromi", a song by Simi from the 2017 album Simisola